Selena Sturmay (born June 21, 1998) is a Canadian curler from Edmonton, Alberta. She currently skips her own team out of the Saville Community Sports Centre.

Career
Sturmay made her first appearance at the Canadian Junior Curling Championships in 2016, skipping her team of Dacey Brown, Megan Moffat and Hope Sunley out of Airdrie. She qualified for the national championship by making a runback double takeout to defeat Kayla Skrlik in the championship game. After a 4–2 round robin record, her team finished 6–4 in the championship pool, placing fifth.

Sturmay and her brother Karsten represented Alberta at the 2018 Canadian Mixed Doubles Curling Championship. There, the pair went 3–4 in the round robin, not enough to qualify for the playoff round. Also in 2018, she was part of the Kristen Streifel rink that won the U Sports/Curling Canada University Curling Championships, qualifying for the 2019 Winter Universiade. There, Team Streifel, representing the University of Alberta, led Canada to a 7–2 round robin record, qualifying for the playoffs. They then lost to Great Britain's Sophie Jackson in the quarterfinals 6–4, settling for fifth.

Sturmay won her second provincial junior title in 2019 skipping a new team of Abby Marks, Kate Goodhelpsen and Paige Papley. At the 2019 Canadian Junior Curling Championships, she would find much more success, posting an undefeated 10–0 record through the round robin and championship pools. This qualified her team for the final where they faced British Columbia's Sarah Daniels. After a tied 6–6 game through eight ends, the Alberta team scored three in the ninth end, going on to win the game by a 9–6 score. The win earned her team the right to represent Canada at the 2019 World Junior Curling Championships, where they qualified for the playoffs with a 6–3 record. They then beat Switzerland's Raphaela Keiser in the semifinal to qualify for the final against Russia's Vlada Rumiantseva. Holding the hammer in the extra end, Sturmay's threw her final draw heavy, giving up a steal of one and the win to the Russian team. Also during the 2018–19 season, she led the Alberta Pandas to a 4–3 record at the University championship, not qualifying for the playoffs.

The following season, Sturmay aged out of juniors and formed a new team with Chantele Broderson, Goodhelpsen and Lauren Marks. The team did not have a successful season, failing to qualify for the playoffs in any of their tour events and not reaching the 2020 Alberta Scotties Tournament of Hearts. She was, however, able to secure her second U Sport title at the 2020 U Sports/Curling Canada University Curling Championships, skipping the Alberta Pandas to a 10–2 victory over Justine Comeau's UNB Reds team in the final game.

After joining the Kayla Skrlik rink at third for the abbreviated 2020–21 season, Sturmay returned to skipping her own team of former teammates Abby Marks, Catherine Clifford, Paige Paley and Kate Goodhelpsen for the 2021–22 season. The team was able to find success on tour, reaching the final of the Alberta Curling Series: Avonair spiel and the semifinals of the Red Deer Curling Classic and the Alberta Curling Series: Thistle event respectively. They also qualified for the 2022 Alberta Scotties Tournament of Hearts, where they finished in seventh place with a 2–5 record. The team ended their season at the Alberta Curling Tour Championship where they defeated Team Skrlik 9–2 in the championship game. Sturmay did not play in the team's final event, however. Additionally, Sturmay spared for Team Skrlik at the 2022 Best of the West event where they went 1–2, missing the playoffs.

Team Sturmay began the 2022–23 season at the 2022 Alberta Curling Series: Event 1 where they lost in the final to South Korea's Gim Eun-ji. In September, they were invited to compete in the 2022 PointsBet Invitational due to ranking thirteenth in the CTRS standings. They were able to upset Chelsea Carey in the opening round before losing to eventual champions Jennifer Jones in the quarterfinal round.

Personal life
Sturmay is employed as a registered nurse for the Alberta Health Services. She is married to Keaton Boyd.

Teams

References

External links

1998 births
Canadian women curlers
Living people
Curlers from Edmonton
University of Alberta alumni
20th-century Canadian women
21st-century Canadian women